Leopardstown Racecourse  is an Irish horse-racing venue, located in Leopardstown, Dún Laoghaire–Rathdown,  south of the Dublin city centre. Like the majority of Irish courses, it hosts both National Hunt and Flat racing.

The course, built by Captain George Quin and modelled on Sandown Park Racecourse in England, was completed in 1888 and acquired by the Horse Racing Board of Ireland in 1967. Many important races are held here and racing takes place all year round, with about 22 meetings per year.

In 1941, noted Royal Air Force pilot Hugh Verity, who flew many secret agents at night into and out of farm fields in France, force landed on the Race Course. He was interned briefly before escaping back to England.

The Leopardstown Hall of Fame honours famous Irish horse racing trainers, jockeys and horses like, Vincent O'Brien, Tom Dreaper, Pat Taaffe and Pat Eddery, Arkle, Dawn Run, Levmoss and Nijinsky.

Facilities

Leopardstown golf course and club house is situated in the middle of the racetrack.  The course also has designer shops, a fitness centre, the Leopardstown Pavilion, Fillies Café Bar, the Silken Glider Restaurant, the Paddock Food Hall, Club 92 nightclub, Madigans pub, and numerous bars and snack areas.  A farmers market is also on-site every Friday. The 'Bulmers Live at Leopardstown' music festival takes place every summer between June and August. Acts such as Horslips, The Human League, Johnny Marr, and The Boomtown Rats have all performed here.

Notable races

The Irish Champion stakes is the most important race at the course and one of the World Series of Racing. It is held every September and attracts the cream of racing thoroughbreds.

Transport
A Luas Green Line stop is located at the southern end of the racecourse.  However, as of January 2016 it remains unopened and devoid of all signage, with trams passing through non-stop.  The nearest active Luas stop is Central Park.

See also
 Fairyhouse racecourse
 List of Irish flat horse races
 Phoenix Stakes
 Trial races for the Epsom Derby

References

External links
Official site

 
Leopardstown Racecourse
Sports venues in Dún Laoghaire–Rathdown
Sports venues completed in 1888
1888 establishments in Ireland
Cross country running venues